Triggerfinger is the self-titled debut album of Belgian rock band Triggerfinger. Released on 26 January 2004 via Green L.F.ant Records, the album features the singles "Inner Peace" and "Camaro", the latter of which features guitar riffs based on the song Kashmir by English rock band Led Zeppelin.

Track listing

Personnel
Ruben Block - lead vocals, guitar
Paul Van Bruystegem - bass guitar, backing vocals
Mario Goossens - drums, backing vocals

External links
Band's official website

2004 debut albums
Triggerfinger albums